Jan Kvěch (born 18 October 2001) is an international speedway rider from the Czech Republic.

Career 
Kvěch won the bronze medal at the Czech Republic Championship in 2019. He qualified for the 2021 Speedway Grand Prix and won the 2020 European Individual Speedway Under 19 Championship.

He won the silver medal at the World Under-21 Championship in the 2022 SGP2 and a silver medal at the 2022 Czech National Championship.

References 

Living people
2001 births
Czech speedway riders
People from Strakonice
Sportspeople from the South Bohemian Region